Turn Left, Turn Right may refer to:

Books
 Turn Left, Turn Right (A Chance of Sunshine), an illustrated book by Jimmy Liao

Film and television
 Turn Left, Turn Right, a 2003 Hong Kong-Singaporean film by Warner Bros
 Turn Left Turn Right (2020 TV series), a 2020 Thai television series by GMMTV